Liopropoma carmabi, the candy basslet, is a species of fish in the family Serranidae.

Description 
Liopropoma carmabi constitute a size that is smaller than most Liopropoma species and remain small, with a body length that can range up to 6.0 centimeters. Typically, males on average extend to 5.1 cm and females to 4.45 cm. L. carmabi are found to have approximately 67 dorsal spines and 1,213 dorsal soft rays. The head, body, and caudal fin of the candy basslet houses horizontal orange and lavender stripes, separated by red lines, giving it a defined vignette, thus signifying why the species chooses a secretive fashion of housing. They also embody a typical torpedo shaped body, one that is common among Liopropoma species. Two distinct markers are the two black dots on the back of the caudal fin. In addition, gill rakers are also a feature. The Candy Basslet has ctenoid scales with everything on the head scaled except for the lips and a small portion on the front of the snout. Its caudal fin is rounded, and the anal fin is positioned behind where the second dorsal fin begins.

Distribution 
Liopropoma carmabi is one of five species of Liopropoma that reside in the deep waters of the tropical Atlantic Ocean, ranging from the Florida Keys, and along the eastern Caribbean, to as far as the northern coast of South America. It is most commonly found near the island of Curacao.

Taxonomy 
The candy basslet is part of the family Serranidae (sea bass, groupers and reef basslets). It's one of 37 species of reef basslets in the tribe Liopropomini. L. carmabi houses many similarities with two other Lioporpoma species; the Swissguard Basslet (L. rubre) and the Swales Basslet (L. swalisi), including size and coloration. However, its more defined and intense phenotypic coating can easily differentiate it from the other two.

Habitat and ecology 
The species is widely distributed in the mentioned areas above. They are most notable for their cryptic style of living, and thus prefer to situate in deeper habitats. The closest distance they are found to live near the surface is at 25m below, and they can live as deep as 100m from the surface. L. carmabi are commonly found over rocky reefs, especially areas with more minimally sized corals, and instead rich rock shelter and rubble. This particular species of fish also accustom to living at a mean temperature of 27 degrees Celsius. Commercially, due to their defined and appealing phenotype, aquarium trade is desirable but rare, because of the difficulty to reach their deep habitats. Ornamental marine fishes are known to be high in abundance in India. Liopropoma carmabi are used in ornamental fish trading due to their striking color.  An individual of the species is worth $1,000 ranking it at #10 for the world’s most expensive tropical fish from India. If deep-water populations decrease, this will reduce predator-prey interaction in the ecosystem. If climate variation increases, deep-water species will migrate to new habitats and increase populations if resources are substantial.

Reproductive behavior 
In shadier environments, or environments that cater to being more secretive, the species are prone to swim in a manner where both sexes are traveling in parallel to each other with their operculum's in contact. This behavior indicates courtship between the two sexes, and spawning takes place: an external mode of zygote fertilization.Similarly, to the genus Liopropoma, Epinephelinae distributes spherical, small to medium eggs offshore from oceanic islands in the open sea. Liopropoma carmabi has the most unique larva compared to other larvae of the family Serranidae.

Diet 
Feeding behavior of L. carmabi usually includes crustaceans such as brine shrimps and crabs that are of a small enough size to fit in the basslet's relatively small mouth. Candy basslets also consume other meaty seafood such as krill.

Conservation 
The invasive lionfish, Pterois, is known to prey on candy basslets, but the extent of this threat has not been determined. Due to unknown major threats, and the wide distribution of the species across the tropical Atlantic, it is listed under Least Concern when categorizing the endangerment of species.

References 

carmabi
Fish described in 1963